Clarence H. Adams (November 1, 1905 – May 10, 1987) was an American government official and businessman who served as a commissioner of the U.S. Securities and Exchange Commission from 1952 to 1956.

Early life
Adams was born on November 1, 1905 in Ogunquit, Maine (then part of Wells, Maine) to Orin J. Adams and Rose (Moody) Adams. In 1923 he graduated from Wells High School. He began his banking career with the York County Trust Company in Ogunquit. In 1923 he moved to Hartford to work as a cashier for Fuller, Richter, Aldrich & Co.

Government career
From 1931 to 1952, Adams was the Securities Administrator for Connecticut Banking Department. He was the first person to hold this position. During this time he also was director of the Connecticut Fraud Bureau, assistant to the state banking commissioner and president of the National Association of State Securities Administrators.

He was a member U.S. Securities and Exchange Commission from 1952 to 1956.

Business career
After leaving the SEC, Adams became chairman and chief executive officer of National Equities Inc., a private real estate investment and development company. In this role he also served as vice president and treasurer of the Kratter Corporation, vice president of Ruppert Knickerbocker Brewery, and trustee and President of the Boston Celtics.

Personal life
On October 10, 1931, Adams married Arlene M. Sawyer. They remained married until his death in 1987. They had two daughters.

Adams was a member of the Republican Party, Freemasons, Knights Templar, Royal Order of Jesters, and Shriners.

Adams was a resident of Ogunquit, Maine, Bloomfield, Connecticut, Washington, D.C., and Mamaroneck, New York.

Death
Adams died on May 10, 1987 in Portland, Maine.

References

1905 births
1987 deaths
American financial businesspeople
Boston Celtics executives
Members of the U.S. Securities and Exchange Commission
People from Bloomfield, Connecticut
People from Ogunquit, Maine
Businesspeople from Washington, D.C.
People from Mamaroneck, New York
Connecticut Republicans
20th-century American businesspeople
Truman administration personnel
Eisenhower administration personnel